Poecilosomella conspicua is a distinctive species of flies belonging to the family Sphaeroceridae. It is only known from the Crocker Range, Sabah in northern Borneo.

This is a large and robust fly compared to most of its congeners, with a body length of up to 3 mm. The body is generally dark with prominent yellow rings on the legs and yellow base to the halteres. The wings are brown with some darker and lighter markings.

References

Sphaeroceridae
Diptera of Asia
Insects of Borneo
Endemic fauna of Borneo
Endemic fauna of Malaysia
Insects described in 2002